The Journal of International Money and Finance is a peer-reviewed academic journal in economics that was established in 1982 . It was originally published by Butterworth–Heinemann, then by Pergamon, which is now incorporated into Elsevier. The editor-in-chief is J.R. Lothian (Fordham University).

History
According to its first editor, Michael R. Darby, the journal was established to cope with the explosive growth of research on international finance. In its focus on this field, the journal used a broad definition encompassing, among others, topics such as optimum currency area, international financial institutions, open economy macroeconomics, and international asset pricing models.

Abstracting and indexing 
The journal is abstracted and indexed by ABI/Inform, Journal of Economic Literature, Current Contents/Social & Behavioral Sciences, and the Social Sciences Citation Index. According to the Journal Citation Reports, the journal has a 2020 impact factor of 2.731.

References

External links 
 

Business and management journals
Publications established in 1982
Elsevier academic journals
English-language journals